Fernando Meligeni was the defending champion but lost in the first round to Marcelo Filippini.

Magnus Gustafsson won in the final 6–1, 6–3 against Andriy Medvedev.

Seeds
A champion seed is indicated in bold text while text in italics indicates the round in which that seed was eliminated.

  Stefan Edberg (semifinals)
  Carlos Costa (semifinals)
 n/a
  Magnus Gustafsson (champion)
  Andriy Medvedev (final)
  Tomás Carbonell (quarterfinals)
  Filip Dewulf (first round)
  Christian Ruud (first round)

Draw

External links
 1996 Swedish Open draw

Men's Singles
Singles